Pariah is a fictional character in stories published by DC Comics. A scientist, he first appeared in the limited series Crisis on Infinite Earths #1 (April 1985) and was created by Marv Wolfman and George Pérez.

Fictional biography

Crisis on Infinite Earths
In the 1985 12-issue comic book limited series Crisis on Infinite Earths, Pariah (real name Kell Mossa) was one of the greatest scientists from his version of Earth (retconned as an alternate dimension rather than a parallel Earth). Pariah's unorthodox experiments to view the creation of the Universe result in the Anti-Monitor learning of his Earth's existence and destruction with waves of anti-matter. He survived through the intervention of the benevolent counterpart known as the Monitor, and acquired the ability to travel from one alternate Earth to another, forced to witness untold millions perish. 

During the Crisis, Lady Quark is saved by Pariah before the anti-matter destroys Lady Quark's universe, making the woman into the lone survivor of Earth-Six. Pariah blames himself for his own world's destruction, the Anti-Monitor's release, and the subsequent destruction of universe after universe, until he finally learns he was essentially blameless. 

Pariah is told by the Anti-Monitor that his scientific investigation did not unleash forces great enough to destroy a universe. Pariah merely opened the antimatter portal to the dawn of time. Taking advantage of Pariah's experiment, the Anti-Monitor converted antimatter into energy, then focused it onto Pariah's universe. Those worlds' destruction allowed the gathering of more energy, which then made the Anti-Monitor strong enough to break free of the prison. 

After the Anti-Monitor's destruction, the reformed Earth is safe. Pariah and Lady Quark ask the Harbinger to join in exploring the new Earth. The Harbinger agrees to accompany the two on their journey. As the three disembark, the Harbinger tells the two of being hopeful of the future and what it might bring.

Infinite Crisis
Many years later, Pariah attempts to warn Lex Luthor that a dangerous predator is coming; "Lex" is in actuality Alexander Luthor of Earth-Three in disguise to create a new Secret Society of Super Villains. Pariah is subsequently murdered by Alexander in Villains United mini-series. He is later resurrected by the Dark Angel.

Blackest Night
As part of the Blackest Night event, Pariah's corpse is reanimated by a black power ring and recruited to the Black Lantern Corps. He interrupts a cadre of mystical heroes gathered to investigate the strange occurrences of the event. Pariah is seen again as the black rings restore the planet Xanshi.

New 52
In The New 52. Pariah can be seen inside a cell within "the Circus" prison of A.R.G.U.S.

Infinite Frontier
During the Infinite Frontier epilogue, Pariah reappears within the ruins of The Multiverse-2, where he traps the Flash within a pocket dimension dubbed "Earth-Flash.1". It is revealed that has been brought back to life due to the Flash creating Flashpoint during which Pariah fell through a crack left in the new Multiverse. He was held prisoner by the Empty Hand and The Gentry, who forced him to watch as they devoured the infinite Earths one by one. His captors eventually left to invade the new fifty-two Earths.

Dark Crisis
Due to the cycle of destruction and rebirth. Pariah decided that he would create perfect worlds for everyone. He made a deal with the Great Darkness and became its "voice", gaining immense cosmic power, and also began building an army for the Darkness. 

When Barry's teammates in Justice League Incarnate came to rescue him, he refused to leave as he did not recognize them or remember his previous life. Pariah confronted them. A rattled Doctor Multiverse teleports the team away back to Multiverse-1 after using her multivision to see what the latter was. They soon headed to Earth 0 to gather reinforcements, just as Pariah had planned. He met with the Great Darkness, which had bent a cadre of cosmic villains to its will.

Powers and abilities
Pariah is seemingly indestructible and immortal. Granted by the Monitor, he displays few additional superhuman physical capabilities otherwise, except flight. He considers the powers he has a curse, dooming him to witness horrors he cannot stop. During the Crisis on Infinite Earths, Pariah can survive Antimonitor's antimatter erasure and teleports to other multiverses based on its focal point of destruction. Pariah has the ability of flight allowing him to travel to outer space and other dimensions. Before the Dark Crisis event, Pariah can develop superhuman strengths par with superman and resists multiple punches from Black Adam because of his physical invulnerability. He is also capable of creating pocket dimensions to an alternate reality and eradicating the Justice League from existence after he negotiates with the Great Darkness.

In other media
A loose adaptation of Pariah appears in live-action media set in the Arrowverse, portrayed by Tom Cavanagh. First appearing the sixth season of The Flash, Nash Wells is a multiversal traveler whose objective is to find and kill Mar Novu / The Monitor, believing him to be a false god. During his travels, Nash travels to Earth-1, in which he finds a gate beneath Central City. After accidentally opening it, he frees Novu's evil counterpart, the Anti-Monitor, from his confinement. During the events of the crossover "Crisis on Infinite Earths", Nash became a "Pariah" for releasing the Anti-Monitor and is forced to bear witness to the destruction of the multiverse. As the Anti-Monitor destroys Earth-1, Nash sends the recruited Paragons to the Vanishing Point under Novu's orders. Following the Anti-Monitor's defeat, Nash is restored to his original self and temporarily lacked his memories as Pariah until the Martian Manhunter restored them to remind him of what he did. For some time, Nash becomes infused with Eobard Thawne although Thawne doesn’t have his speed due to Nash not being a speedster. Cisco Ramon builds an excorism device that he and Barry Allen use to free Nash from Thawne. Nash and the other Wells agree to sacrifice themselves so that Barry can activate his artificial Speed Force.

References

External links
 Pariah at DC Comics Wiki

Characters created by George Pérez
Characters created by Marv Wolfman
Comics characters introduced in 1985
DC Comics male characters
DC Comics scientists
Fictional characters from parallel universes
Fictional characters with dimensional travel abilities
Fictional characters with immortality
Fictional physicists